Selli is a small village community in Rethymno regional unit, Crete, Greece.

It is located in a distance of 17 km from the city of Rethymno in the foothills of Mount Vrysinas. The name comes from the Byzantine word σέλλα, σελλίν, σελλία, which means seat or saddle. In Crete the word has come to mean a mountain gap and all communities built there are called σελλιά or σελλί.

The community is first recorded in 1411. During the times of Turkish domination people from Selli helped in the revolts against Turkish rule. Some of them include Stylianos G. Giakoumakis, Ioannis G. Giakoumakis, Haralambos G. Andreadakis, Ioannis Emm. Giakoumakis, A. Giakoumakis, G. Vouloumpasis, A. Andreadakis, E. Giakoumakis.

Selli's population

References
Book:O Vrysinas (Ο Βρύσινας) by author Mihalis Emm. Antonogiannakis (Μιχάλης Εμμ. Αντωνογιαννάκης)

Populated places in Rethymno (regional unit)
Villages in Greece